Lipanimal is a town and Village Development Committee in the Bara District of the Narayani Zone of south-eastern Nepal. At the time of the 1991 Nepal census it had a population of 4,177 persons living in 628 households. Jitendra Sonal is the politician from this village and is also the member of provincial assembly of a Madhesh state. Lipanimal has a high school called Shree Bhoj Bhagat higher secondary school.

References

External links
UN map of the municipalities of Bara District

Populated places in Bara District